The 42nd Golden Bell Awards was held on 17 November 2007 at Sun Yat-sen Memorial Hall in Taipei, Taiwan. The ceremony was broadcast live by Azio TV.

Winners and nominees
Below is the list of winners and nominees for the main categories.

References

2007
2007 television awards
2007 in Taiwan